Captain Kirton Huggins, ED, psc is director of the Strategic Project Management Office.

Huggins is a former Commanding Officer of the Trinidad and Tobago Coast Guard (COTTCG). Prior to that he was Executive Officer of the Trinidad and Tobago Coast Guard (XOTTCG), assuming the position from XOTTCG J Ramoutar on June 14, 2005. Huggins was once assigned as the Procurement Officer of the Coast Guard.

Coast Guard career

After attending basic training at Staubles Bay in Chaguaramas in 1978, his first duty station was to a patrol boat.

Academic degrees

Commander Huggins' educational accomplishments include a Bachelor of Science Degree magna cum laude from University of the West Indies.

Personal
Commander Huggins is married and has three children. He has been installed as Vice President, Lions Club of Port of Spain Central for the fiscal year 2009/2010.

Sources
This article incorporates text in the public domain from various sites.

External links
Trinidad and Tobago Coast Guard Official site
Airguns Trinidad and Tobago

Trinidad and Tobago Coast Guard personnel
Living people
Year of birth missing (living people)